Dora Szabados (born 20 May 2006)  is a Hungarian rhythmic gymnast, member of the national group.

Career 
In 2022 Dora was included into the national senior group, debuting at the World Cup in Pamplona, ending 7th in the All-Around and with 5 hoops and 6th with 3 ribbons and 2 balls. A week later the group competed in Portimão, taking 7th place in the All-Around and 6th in the two event finals. In June she competed at the 2022 European Championships in Tel Aviv, finishing 9th in teams, 8th in the All-Around, 11th in the 5 hoops final and 8th with 3 ribbons + 2 balls. In September Szabados took part in the World Championships in Sofia along Lujza Varga, Alexa Amina Meszaros, Lilla Jurca, Mandula Virag Meszaros and Monika Urban-Szabo and the individuals Fanni Pigniczki and Hanna Panna Wiesner, taking 16th place in the All-Around, 16th with 5 hoops and 15th with 3 ribbons + 2 balls.

References 

2006 births
Living people
Hungarian rhythmic gymnasts
Gymnasts from Budapest